Luc Rosenzweig (August 8, 1943 – July 13, 2018) was a French journalist for Libération and Le Monde, and author of several books.

Early life
Rosenzweig was born on August 8, 1943 in Bonn, Haute Savoie. His father, Rolf Rozenzweig, was a Polish Jewish communist who emigrated to France in 1933.

Rosenzweig went to preparatory school and became associated with the Center for Institutional Study, Research, and Training (CERFI), a left-wing research center.

Career
Rosenzweig began his career as a German teacher. He first worked as a journalist for Nouvelles d’Orléans in Orléans in the 1970s. From 1982 to 1985, he was a journalist for Libération. He later worked for Le Monde, France's paper of record. He was the editor-in-chief of Regards for two years.

Rosenzweig was the author of several books on Judaism, including La Jeune France juive and Catalogue pour les juifs de maintenant.

Death
Rosenzweig died on July 13, 2018.

References

1943 births
2018 deaths
French people of Polish-Jewish descent
People from Bonneville, Haute-Savoie
Le Monde writers
French male journalists
20th-century French journalists
21st-century French journalists